Podkova  is a 1913 Austro-Hungarian comedy film directed by Max Urban and written by his wife, Anna Sedlácková. In it, a young man finds a horseshoe and keeps it, thinking it will bring him luck. The opposite is true.

External links
 
 Entry at Česko-Slovenská filmová databáze Google translation

1913 comedy films
1913 films
Austro-Hungarian films
Austrian silent films
Hungarian silent films
Hungarian black-and-white films
Austrian black-and-white films
Austrian comedy films
Hungarian comedy films
Czech comedy films
Lost Czech films